Bist or BIST may refer to:

Bansal Institute of Science and Technology, in Bhopal, India
Bharath Institute of Science and Technology, former name of Bharath University, in Chennai, Tamil Nadu, India
Borsa Istanbul
Bist (river), on the France-Germany border
Bist (village), in Azerbaijan
Built-in self-test, an integrated circuit feature